John Bird (died c. 1445) was the member of the Parliament of England for Marlborough in the parliaments of 1402, May 1413, November 1414, 1415, 1426, 1429, 1435, and 1437.

References 

Members of Parliament for Marlborough
English MPs 1402
English MPs May 1413
English MPs November 1414
English MPs 1415
English MPs 1426
English MPs 1429
English MPs 1435
English MPs 1437
14th-century English politicians
Year of birth unknown
1440s deaths
Tax collectors
Escheators
Verderers
Bailiffs
15th-century English landowners